St. George's HSS Kothamangalam is an aided school under the management of The Corporate Educational Agency, the Diocese of Kothamangalam, India. It was established in 1936. It is located in Kothamangalam.

St. George Higher Secondary School has an extensive athletics training program. Products of the school include Olympian and 2010 Commonwealth Games gold medalist Sini Jose, 2018 Asian Games gold medalist V. K. Vismaya.

The school is located at Cheriypally Thazham Kothamangalam, near the Mar. Baselios church Kothamangalam. More than 1,600 students are studying in a year.
 
The school has four subjects on higher secondary level - Biology science, Computer Science, Commerce, Humanities.

References

Christian schools in Kerala
High schools and secondary schools in Kerala
Schools in Ernakulam district
Kothamangalam
Educational institutions established in 1936
1936 establishments in India